Steve Sandor (October 27, 1937–April 5, 2017) was an actor who made his first television appearance on Star Trek, playing Lars in the second season episode "The Gamesters of Triskelion".

Before becoming an actor, Sandor grew up in the Greenfield neighborhood of Pittsburgh. Employed as a steel worker before his acting career, he also used to train sentry dogs while serving as an Air Police Officer in the U.S. Air Force.

Having appeared in many television shows such as Gunsmoke, Ironside, The Streets of San Francisco, Starsky and Hutch, CHiPs, Charlie's Angels, Fantasy Island, Three's Company, The A-Team, Knight Rider, and Hardcastle and McCormick, he is perhaps best known for his role as the ill-fated biker gang leader Stanley in the 1980 cult film The Ninth Configuration, and as the voice of the heroic Darkwolf in the 1983 animated fantasy film Fire and Ice.

Sandor also had supporting roles in the 1967 western Rough Night in Jericho, the 1968 crime drama If He Hollers, Let Him Go!, the 1969 World War II classic The Bridge at Remagen, the 1969 outlaw biker film Hell's Angels '69, the 1971 western One More Train to Rob, the 1973 crime drama Bonnie's Kids, the 1973 Vietnam film The No Mercy Man, a semi-regular role on the short-lived TV series The Yellow Rose, and the title role in the 1983 science fiction film Stryker. Sandor was also part of the extensive cast of the epic 1978 TV mini-series Centennial. He was also cast in the 1988 IMAX film Alamo: The Price of Freedom as the legendary Jim Bowie.

Filmography

References

External links

1937 births
American male film actors
American male television actors
Male actors from Pittsburgh
2017 deaths